Odin Owns Ye All is the second full-length album by the Norwegian Viking metal band Einherjer. Its songs form a brief, but complete, narrative of the earth based on Norse mythology. The opening tracks tell the story of the giant Ymir, his death at the hands of Odin and his brothers, and the creation of the world. The later tracks tell of the murder of Balder that precipitates Ragnarok, followed by the destruction of the world and its rebirth from the sea. The album cover art is the painting “Odin and His Ravens” by Alan Lee.

Track listing
 "Leve Vikingeaanden" (Long Live the Viking Spirit) – 1:35
 "Out of Ginnungagap"  – 5:37
 "Clash of the Elder" – 5:19
 "Odin Owns Ye All" – 4:34
 "Remember Tokk" – 5:30
 "Home" – 7:16
 "The Pathfinder & The Prophetess" –  3:42
 "Inferno"  – 4:51
 "A New Earth" – 6:51

All Songs by Glesnes/Storesund except "Leve Vikingeaanden" and "Clash of the Elder" by Storesund

Credits
 Gerhard Storesund – drums, synthesizer, backing vocals
 Frode Glesnes – guitar, backing vocals
 Ragnar Vikse – lead and backing vocals
 Erik Elden – bass guitar, backing vocals

References

Einherjer albums
1998 albums
Concept albums
Ymir
Works based on Norse mythology